The climate of Bismarck in the U.S. state of North Dakota is  humid continental (Köppen Dfa/Dfb), caused primarily by the combination of its mid-level latitude and location not far from the geographic centre of the U.S. Its summers are hot enough for it to border on having a Köppen Dwa classification, and precipitation is high enough for it to barely avoid being classified as semi-arid (Köppen climate classification BSk). The city's climate displays four very distinct seasons and great variation in temperatures over very short periods of time. Like other cities in the northern Great Plains, its climate is also fairly dry.

Overview

Temperatures
Temperatures in Bismarck are variable throughout most of the year, with some stability in summer due to the yearly weakening of the jet stream. Nevertheless, there are four very distinct seasons, with great temperature variation. Overnight low temperatures in July average .

Highs reach the freezing mark on about one-third of the days from December to February, and lows reach  or below on 42 nights per year.

Extremes
The temperature has reached or exceeded  in Bismarck a total of five times in recorded weather history.

Precipitation
The climate of Bismarck tends to be dry, with yearly precipitation averaging only . The wettest month of the year on average is June, when a majority of precipitation falls as rain from thunderstorms. June averages  of precipitation.  December is the driest month, averaging only , as precipitation falls as fluffy, low moisture-content snow. In the winter, Bismarck averages  of snow annually.

The 1990s were a very moist period for Bismarck. The earlier part of the decade was documented for heavy snowfall as the snowiest winter on record in Bismarck was the winter of 1996–97, when  of snow fell. This wet period led into an extended drought period in the early 2000s that continued into 2006.

Sun

The area averages 4 hours of daily sunshine in December. July is the sunniest month, with an average 11.4 hours of daily sunshine. The total of around 2740 hours of sunshine per year means that the area receives 62.53% of possible sunshine.

Notes and references

External links
NWS Bismarck, ND Home Page - US National Weather Service Station site
National Weather Service Climate - Climate Data for NWS Bismarck
Climate outlook for Bismarck from KFYR-TV
Climate history for Bismarck at WeatherUnderground.com

Bismarck, North Dakota
Bismarck
Bismarck